Gustaf Hamilton may refer to:

 Gustaf Wathier Hamilton (1783–1835), Swedish count, jurist and official
 Gustav Hamilton (1650s–1691),  chief of defence in Northern Ireland
 Gustav David Hamilton (1699–1788), Swedish count and soldier